State Route 35 (SR 35) was a state highway in Los Angeles and Orange counties in the U.S. state of California. It existed from 1934 to 1964. It extended from U.S. Route 60 (US 60)/US 70/US 99 (Garvey Avenue) in Baldwin Park to SR 22 (Garden Grove Boulevard) in Seal Beach. The highway followed Puente Avenue, Workman Mill Road, Norwalk Boulevard, San Antonio Drive, Pioneer Boulevard,  Centralia Street, and Los Alamitos Boulevard. In the 1964 renumbering, SR 35 was replaced with Interstate 605 (I-605), and the number was assigned to a different highway in the northern part of the state.

Major intersections

External links
 California Highways listing

035